Tridax procumbens, commonly known as coatbuttons or tridax daisy, is a species of flowering plant in the family Asteraceae.  It is best known as a widespread weed and pest plant. It is native to the tropical Americas including Mexico, but it has been introduced to tropical, subtropical, and mild temperate regions worldwide. It is listed as a noxious weed in the United States and has pest status in nine states.

Common names 

Its common names include coatbuttons and tridax daisy in English.

Languages in other languages include:
European languages: cadillo chisaca in Spanish, herbe caille in French.

Indo-Aryan languages:  jayanti veda (जयंती वेद) and "Avanti" in Sanskrit,"Ghajadvu" in Gujarati  bikhalyakarani in Assamese, ghamra in Hindi, Tridhara (ত্রিধারা) in Bengali,  kambarmodi, Jakhamjudi & tantani (कंबरमोडी, जखमजुडी & टनटनी) in Marathi, Ghaburi (ઘાબુરી) in Gujarati.

Dravidian languages: jayanthi(ಜಯoತಿ) in Kannada, "Kumminnippacha", (കുമ്മിനിന്നിപാച്ച) "Kurikootticheera",(കുറികോട്ടിച്ചിചിറ) "Muriyampachila" (മുരിയമ്പാചില), "Odiyancheera", (ഒഡിയൻ‌ചിറ) "Railpoochedi, (റൈലാപൂച്ചെഡി) "Sanipoovu",(ഷാനിപോവ്) "Thelkuthi", (തെക്കുത്തി) "Chiravanakku", (ചിരവനാക്ക്) in Malayalam, bishalya karani (ବିଶଲ୍ୟକରଣୀ) in Oriya, gayapaaku (గాయపాకు) & gaddi chemanthi (గడ్డి చామంతి) & balapaaku (బలపాకు) in Telugu,vettukaaya poondu or thatha poo or kinatruppasan (கிணற்றுப்பாசான்)  in Tamil. 

Other Asian languages: kotobukigiku in Japanese and tīn túkkæ (ตีนตุ๊กแก; 'gecko feet') in Thai. in Urdu it is known as zagh mai hayat.

Description

The plant bears daisy-like yellow-centered white or yellow flowers with three-toothed ray florets. The leaves are toothed and generally arrowhead-shaped. Calyx is represented by scales or reduced to pappus.

Its fruit is a hard achene covered with stiff hairs and having a feathery, plumelike white pappus at one end. The plant is invasive in part because it produces so many of these achenes, up to 1500 per plant, and each achene can catch the wind in its pappus and be carried some distance. This plant can be found in fields, meadows, croplands, disturbed areas, lawns, and roadsides in areas with tropical or semi-tropical climates.  It is listed in the United States as a Noxious Weed and regulated under the Federal Noxious Weed Act.

Use in traditional medicine 
Traditionally, Tridax procumbens has been in use in India for wound healing and as an anticoagulant, antifungal, and insect repellent. Tridax procumbens is also used as treatment for boils, blisters, and cuts by local healers in parts of India.

Chemical constituents 
The flavonoid procumbenetin has been isolated from the aerial parts of Tridax procumbens. Other chemical compounds isolated from the plant include alkyl esters, sterols, pentacyclic triterpenes, fatty acids, and polysaccharides. Several main active chemical compounds were found to be present. But toxicological knowledge is scarce and more research described to be needed on this plant.

Gallery

References

Further reading

External links

PIER fact sheet
invasive.org profile
Photo gallery

Millerieae
Plants described in 1753
Taxa named by Carl Linnaeus
Flora of Mexico
Flora of South America